Ausangate  or Auzangate (in Hispanicized spellings) is a mountain of the Vilcanota mountain range in the Andes of Peru. With an elevation of 6,384 metres, it is situated around 100 kilometres southeast of Cusco in the Cusco Region, Canchis Province, Pitumarca District, and in the Quispicanchi Province, Ocongate District.

The mountain has significance in Incan mythology.

Every year the Quyllur Rit'i (Quechua for "star snow") festival which attracts thousands of Quechua pilgrims is celebrated about 20 km north of the Ausangate at the mountain Qullqipunku. It takes place one week before the Corpus Christi feast.

The region is inhabited by llama and alpaca herding communities, and constitutes one of the few remaining pastoralist societies in the world. High mountain trails are used by these herders to trade with agricultural communities at lower elevations. Currently, one of these trails, "the road of the Apu Ausangate", is one of the most renowned treks in Peru.

The area has four major geological features, the Andean uplift formed by Granits, the hanging glaciers and glacial erosional valleys, the Permian formation with its singular colors: red, ochre, and turquoise and the Cretaceous, limestone forests.

Archaeological sites on the Ausangate and Vinicunca Route
 Colonial Bridge of Checacupe
 Colonial Temple of Checacupe
 Siwinaqocha
 Laguna Ausangate
 Ananiso Canyon
 Rock Climbing - Huayllasqa
 Uchullucllo Thermal Baths

The legend of the Ausangate Mountain

Protagonist of legends told through generations since the Inca Empire, the nevado is still venerated as a divinity (called Apu (god)) by the inhabitants of its surroundings.

Gallery

See also 
 Jatun Pucacocha

References

Six-thousanders of the Andes
Mountains of Peru
Mountains of Cusco Region